Callum Priestley (born 13 February 1989) is a British former track and field athlete who specialised in sprint hurdling. He was banned after a positive sample for banned substances, namely clenbuterol, was found in a urine sample whilst training with the UK team in South Africa in January 2010. Despite evidence of tainted food, the ban was upheld. Subsequent to the ban, Priestley retired from competitive athletics.

He began competing in athletics while at school and finished second in the 110 metres hurdles at the 2005 English Schools' Athletic Association Championships. Progressing through the ranks at youth level, he represented Great Britain at the 2007 European Athletics Junior Championships and reached the hurdles final, although he did not finish the race.

The 2009 season proved to be a breakthrough at national level as he took third in the 60 metres hurdles at the UK Indoor Championships. He followed this with second-place finishes outdoors at the England U23 Championships and the UK World Trials/National Championships. At the 2009 European Athletics U23 Championships he won the bronze medal behind Artur Noga and compatriot Gianni Frankis, running a personal best time of 13.63 seconds. A win at the McCain UK Challenge Final in Cardiff meant he earned a share of the £5000 jackpot as he won his race and topped the event rankings in the national competition. He gained lottery funding at the end of the year as part of the 2012 London Olympics development programme.

The next season, he became the national champion indoors with a 60 m hurdles win in Sheffield. Following the victory, he went to train in the UK Athletics winter camp in South Africa that February. There he failed an out-of-competition drugs test, after the prohibited substance clenbuterol was found in his system.

He claimed he ingested the substance unintentionally. Additionally he claimed that he and a number of athletes in the team came down with food poisoning. The team doctor attended and confirmed his symptoms.

Disillusioned with the sport following his ban, he did not return to the sport after its conclusion.

See also
List of doping cases in athletics

References
  
 Priestley's full Press Release. athletics-weekly.com.

External links

1989 births
Living people
English male hurdlers
Doping cases in athletics
English sportspeople in doping cases
Black British sportsmen